"I Didn't Want to Need You" is a song by American rock band Heart. It was composed by veteran songwriter Diane Warren and released as the second single from the band's 10th studio album, Brigade (1990). "I Didn't Want to Need You" is a midtempo rock song with lyrics in which singer Ann Wilson laments her lack of resistance to fall in love with someone. The single peaked at number 23 on the US Billboard Hot 100 and number 14 on the Canadian RPM Top Singles chart. It also reached the top 40 in Ireland and Sweden and number 47 on the UK Singles Chart.

Music video
The majority of the video features close-up shots of the Wilson sisters blended with live shots of the band on the Brigade tour from their stop at the Orlando Arena in Orlando, Florida, on June 9, 1990.

Track listings
7-inch, cassette, and mini-CD single
 "I Didn't Want to Need You" – 4:05
 "The Night" – 4:50

12-inch and CD single
 "I Didn't Want to Need You" – 4:05
 "The Night" – 4:50
 "The Will to Love" – 4:19
 A limited-edition 12-inch vinyl with a poster sleeve was also issued in the UK.

Charts

References

Heart (band) songs
1990 singles
1990 songs
Song recordings produced by Richie Zito
Songs written by Diane Warren